Geoffrey James Whittaker (29 May 1916 – 21 April 1997) was an English cricketer active from 1935 to 1953 who played for Surrey. He was born in Peckham and died in Saint Peter, Jersey. He appeared in 129 first-class matches as a righthanded batsman who scored 4,988 runs with a highest score of 185 not out among eight centuries. Son of Fred Whitaker a professional footballer born Burnley 1888 . He played for Northampton Town .

Notes

1916 births
1997 deaths
English cricketers
Surrey cricketers
Marylebone Cricket Club cricketers
North v South cricketers